Alan Lamb (born 30 January 1970) was an English footballer who played as a striker.

Lamb started his career with Nottingham Forest in 1988, making a loan move to Hereford United in 1989, scoring 2 goals in 10 league appearances. Lamb signed for Hartlepool United at the start of the 1989-90 season where he played 14 league games before a move to non-league Brandon United. Lamb had a two-month trial at Newcastle United from October–December 1991 before signing for non-league Gateshead. Lamb also played in New Zealand between 1995–1999.

Sources

1970 births
Living people
English footballers
Association football forwards
Nottingham Forest F.C. players
Hereford United F.C. players
Hartlepool United F.C. players
Newcastle United F.C. players
Gateshead F.C. players
English Football League players
Brandon United F.C. players